Torben Alstrup Jensen (7 August 1930 – 30 November 2007) was a Danish field hockey player. He competed in the men's tournament at the 1960 Summer Olympics.

References

External links
 

1930 births
2007 deaths
Danish male field hockey players
Olympic field hockey players of Denmark
Field hockey players at the 1960 Summer Olympics
People from Slagelse
Sportspeople from Region Zealand